The Distance State University (UNED), is one of five public universities in the Republic of Costa Rica. It is in Sabanilla, Montes de Oca. UNED is the second university in number of students, and it is the largest coverage in the country. It has its own publishing house that produces textbooks that cover most of the needs of the university, as essayistic works, research, etc. This institution was created in 1977. Its first president was Don Francisco Antonio Pacheco Fernandez.

The university has programs classified into four categories:

 Science education (Bachelor of Special Education, Bachelor of Educational Administration)
 Management sciences (Bachelor of Business Administration with emphasis on Banking and Finance)
 Social sciences and humanities (Bachelor of Criminological Sciences)
 Natural sciences (Agricultural Engineering; Bachelor of Protection and Natural Resource Management)

It also offers graduate programs for master's and doctorate.

UNED Research Journal 
The university publishes UNED Research Journal,  a biannual open access scientific journal. It publishes academic research performed in Latin America, Asia, Africa, North America, and Europe. The journal is indexed in Scielo, Latindex and Redalyc.

It was created in 2008 through an initiative led by former UNED Research Vice-rector Katya Calderón Herrera.  Julián Monge-Nájera became its first and only editor.
 
The first volume was released in January 2009 and since then the journal has published two issues per year. The journal published a printed format up until January 2018, before going fully online.

References

Universities in Costa Rica